Juan de los Ríos y Berriz (1631–1698) was a Roman Catholic prelate who served as Bishop of Santa Cruz de la Sierra (1687–1698).

Biography
Juan de los Ríos y Berriz was born in Lima, Peru. On April 28, 1687, he was selected by the King of Spain and confirmed by Pope Innocent XI as Bishop of Santa Cruz de la Sierra. In 1688, he was consecrated bishop by Melchor Liñán y Cisneros, Archbishop of Lima. He served as Bishop of Santa Cruz de la Sierra until his death in 1698.

References

External links and additional sources
 (for Chronology of Bishops) 
 (for Chronology of Bishops) 

1631 births
1698 deaths
People from Lima
Bishops appointed by Pope Innocent XI
17th-century Roman Catholic bishops in Bolivia
Roman Catholic bishops of Santa Cruz de la Sierra